The Service List was the sole electoral alliance of conservatives for the 2017 municipal election of Tehran.

According to Financial Tribune, the list was compiled by the Popular Front of Islamic Revolution Forces.

Candidates

References 

Electoral lists for Iranian elections
Principlist political groups in Iran